Willington Worthenbury is a community in Wrexham County Borough, Wales, and is situated near the England–Wales border.

It has an area of 2,146 hectares and a population of 730 (2001 census), increasing to 827 at the 2011 census. It contains the villages of Worthenbury and Tallarn Green.

It is located on the eastern side of the River Dee in the English Maelor area which was formerly part of the historic county of Flintshire. It has the lowest proportion of Welsh language speakers of all the communities in Wrexham county borough, with 88.81% having no knowledge of Welsh according to the 2001 census.

Worthenbury
Settlement at Worthenbury may have begun as early as the tenth century. The name Worthenbury may stem from the Saxon name for a stronghold 'burgh', indicating that a fortification may have been situated there.  In 1086, when the Domesday Book was compiled, Worthenbury was listed as a relatively small settlement and it was within the hundred of Duddeston and the county of Cheshire.

There has been a parish church in the village since at least 1388. The current building was built in 1739; it is dedicated to Saint Deiniol and has many Georgian features. South of the village lay Emral Hall, home to the influential Puleston family until 1936 when it was demolished.

Tallarn Green
Tallarn Green also has a small church, completed in 1873 and dedicated to Mary Magdalene. The famous poet R. S. Thomas was curate here in the 1940s.  The churchyard contains the war grave of a Manchester Regiment soldier of World War I.  

The word "green" in the name of the village indicates an area of grassy common land.

References

Clwyd-Powys Archaeological Trust. Maelor Saesneg: The Settlement Landscape. Accessed 5 June 2008.
Davies, John; Jenkins, Nigel; Baines, Menna & Lynch, Peredur I. (2008) The Welsh Academy Encyclopaedia of Wales, University of Wales Press, Cardiff.
Roberts, Vic (2004) Worthenbury, Genuki. Accessed 5 June 2008.
Wrexham County Borough Council. St Mary Magdalene Church. Accessed 5 June 2008.

History of Flintshire
Communities in Wrexham County Borough